The Cathedral of the Incarnation is an Episcopal cathedral in the Guilford neighborhood of Baltimore, Maryland, United States. It is the seat of the Diocese of Maryland.

In 2020, it reported 721 members, 227 average attendance, and plate and pledge income of $489,369.

History
Discussions about building a cathedral in the Diocese of Maryland took place at least as far back as the years William Paret was the bishop (1885–1911). However, it was during the episcopate of John Gardner Murray that the cathedral was built. The so-called Synod Hall was the first constructed building in the planned complex and the congregation met in the undercroft beginning in 1911. The cornerstone for the Synod Hall proper was laid in 1920 and the first worship service was held in the new space in 1932. Plans for a cathedral complex and a separate larger cathedral were then abandoned, and the Synod Hall was redesignated as the cathedral. For the first 35 years it was known as a pro-cathedral.  In 1943, the Cathedral of the Incarnation was first used for the installation ceremony of a bishop, with the ninth Bishop of Maryland. After the cathedral's construction debt was discharged, the Diocese of Maryland passed a resolution establishing the Cathedral of the Incarnation on February 1, 1955, and it was consecrated on November 6, 1955.

The Cathedral House was built in 1967. It houses offices, meeting spaces, and Sunday School rooms.

Gallery

See also
List of the Episcopal cathedrals of the United States
List of cathedrals in the United States

References

20th-century Episcopal church buildings
Gothic Revival church buildings in Maryland
Episcopal church buildings in Maryland
Incarnation, Baltimore
Cathedrals in Maryland
Churches in Baltimore
Northern Baltimore
Churches completed in 1955
1916 establishments in Maryland